Scriptio continua (Latin for "continuous script"), also known as scriptura continua or scripta continua, is a style of writing without spaces or other marks between the words or sentences. The form also lacks punctuation, diacritics, or distinguished letter case. 
In the West, the oldest Greek and Latin inscriptions used word dividers to separate words in sentences; however, Classical Greek and late Classical Latin both employed scriptio continua as the norm.

History
Although scriptio continua is evidenced in most Classic Greek and Classic Latin manuscripts, different writing styles are depicted in documents that date back even further. Classical Latin often used the interpunct, especially in monuments and inscriptions.

The earliest texts in Classical Greek that used the Greek alphabet, as opposed to Linear B, were formatted in a constant string of capital letters from right to left. Later, that evolved to “boustrophedon”, which included lines written in alternating directions. It was only still later that the Romans adapted the Etruscan alphabet to write Latin and, in the process, switched from using points to divide words to the Greek practice of scriptio continua.

Before (and after) the advent of the codex (book), Latin and Greek script was written on scrolls by slave scribes. The role of the scribes was to simply record everything they heard to create documentation. Because speech is continuous, there was no need to add spaces. Typically, the reader of the text was a trained performer, who would have already memorised the content and breaks of the script. During the reading performances, the scroll acted as a cue sheet and therefore did not require in-depth reading.
 
The lack of word parsing forced the reader to distinguish elements of the script without a visual aid, but it also presented the reader with more freedom to interpret the text. The reader had the liberty to insert pauses and dictate tone, which made the act of reading a significantly more subjective activity than it is today. However, the lack of spacing also led to some ambiguity because a minor discrepancy in word parsing could give the text a different meaning. Thus, readers had to be much more cognisant of the context to which the text referred.

Decline
Over time, the current system of rapid silent reading for information replaced the older, slower, and more dramatic performance-based reading, and word dividers and punctuation became more beneficial to text. Though paleographers disagree about the chronological decline of scriptio continua throughout the world, it is generally accepted that the addition of spaces first appeared in Irish and Anglo-Saxon Bibles and Gospels from the seventh and eighth centuries. Subsequently, an increasing number of European texts adopted conventional spacing, and within the thirteenth and fourteenth centuries, all European texts were written with word separation.

When word separation became the standard system, it was seen as a simplification of Roman culture because it undermined the metric and rhythmic fluency generated through scriptio continua. In contrast, paleographers today identify the extinction of scriptio continua as a critical factor in augmenting the widespread absorption of knowledge in the pre-Modern Era. By saving the reader the taxing process of interpreting pauses and breaks, the inclusion of spaces enables the brain to comprehend written text more rapidly. Furthermore, the brain has a greater capacity to profoundly synthesize text and commit a greater portion of information to memory.

Scriptio continua is still in use in Thai script, other Southeast Asian abugidas: (Burmese, Khmer, Javanese, Balinese, Sundanese script), Lao, and in languages that use Chinese characters (Chinese and Japanese). However, modern vernacular Chinese differentiates itself from ancient scriptio continua through its use of punctuation, although this method of separation was borrowed from the West only . Before this, the only forms of punctuation found in Chinese writings were marks to denote quotes, proper nouns, and emphasis. Modern Tibetic languages also employ a form of scriptio continua; while they punctuate syllables, they do not use spacing between units of meaning.

Examples

Latin text
Latin text in scriptio continua with typical capital letters, taken from Cicero's De finibus bonorum et malorum:

NEQVEPORROQVISQVAMESTQVIDOLOREMIPSVMQVIADOLORSITAMETCONSECTETVRADIPISCIVELIT

Which in modern punctuation is:

Neque porro quisquam est qui dolorem ipsum quia dolor sit amet, consectetur, adipisci velit…
"Nobody likes pain for its own sake, or looks for it and wants to have it, just because it is pain…"
With ancient Latin punctuation is: NEQVE·PORRO·QVISQVAM·EST·QVI·DOLOREM·IPSVM·QVIA·DOLOR·SIT·AMET·CONSECTETVR·ADIPISCI·VELIT

Greek text 
Greek text in scriptio continua with typical capital letters, taken from Hesiod's Theogony:

Which in modern punctuation is:
 
 "From the Heliconian Muses let us begin to sing, who hold the great and holy mount of Helicon, and dance on soft feet about the deep-blue spring and the altar of the almighty son of Cronos,"

Runic text 
The entire Swedish Rök runestone is written in scriptio continua, which poses problems for scholars attempting to translate it. One example is a phrase repeated several times, . Interpretations proposed include sagum Ygg minni ("Let us say the memory to Yggr"), sagum mógminni ("Let us say the folk-memory") and sagum ungmenni ("Let us say to the group of young men").

Modern Latin script
A form of scriptio continua has become common in internet e-mail addresses and domain names where, because the "space" character is invalid, the address for a website for "Example Fake Website" is written as examplefakewebsite.com – without spaces between the separate words. However, the "underscore" or "dash" characters are often used as stand-ins for the "space" character when its use would be invalid and their use would not be.

As another example, so-called camel case—in which the first letter of each word is capitalized—has become part of the culture of many computer programming languages. In this context, names of variables and subroutines as well as other identifiers are rendered easier to read, as in MaxDataRate. Camel case can also eliminate ambiguity: CharTable might name a table of characters, whereas Chartable could ask or answer the question, "Can (something) be charted?"

Chinese language
The Chinese did not encounter the problem of incorporating spaces into their text because, unlike most orthographic systems, Chinese characters represent morphemes and not phonemes. Chinese is therefore readable without spaces. On top of that, Chinese also lacked any form of punctuation until the 20th century when interaction with Western civilizations occurred.

Japanese script 
Japanese implements extensive use of Chinese characters, called kanji in Japanese. However, due to the radical differences between the Chinese and Japanese languages, writing Japanese exclusively in kanji would make it extremely difficult to read. This can be seen in texts that predate the modern kana system, in which Japanese was written entirely in kanji and man'yōgana, the latter of which are characters written solely to indicate a word's pronunciation as opposed to its meaning. For that reason, different syllabary systems called kana were developed to differentiate phonetic graphemes from ideographic ones.

Modern Japanese is typically written using three different types of graphemes, the first being kanji and the latter two being kana systems, the cursive hiragana and the angular katakana. While spaces are not normally used in writing, boundaries between words are often quickly perceived by Japanese speakers since kana are usually visually distinct from kanji. Japanese speakers also know that certain words, morphemes, and parts of speech are typically written using one of the three systems. Kanji is typically used for words of Japanese and Chinese origin as well as content words (i.e. nouns, verbs, adjectives, adverbs). Hiragana is typically used for native Japanese words, as well as commonly known words, phrases, and particles, as well as inflections of content words like verbs, adjectives, and adverbs. Katakana is typically used for loanwords from languages other than Chinese, onomatopoeia, and emphasized words.

Like Chinese, Japanese lacked any sort of punctuation until interaction with Western civilizations became more common. Punctuation was adopted during the Meiji Period.

Thai script 
Modern Thai script, which was said to have been created by King Ram Khamhaeng in 1283, does not contain any spaces between words. Spaces indicate only the clear endings of clauses or sentences.

Below is a sample sentence of Thai written first without spaces between words (with Thai romanization in parentheses), second in Thai with spaces between words (also with Thai romanization in parentheses), and then finally translated into English.
 ในน้ำมีปลา ในนามีข้าว (Nın̂ảmīplā  nınāmīk̄ĥāw)
 ใน น้ำ มี ปลา  ใน นา มี ข้าว (Nı n̂ả mī plā  nı nā mī k̄ĥāw) 
 In the water there are fish; in the paddy fields there is rice.

Javanese script 
This example shows the first line of the Universal Declaration of Human Rights in Javanese script, and a case of the text being divided, as in some modern writing, by spaces and dash signs, which look different.  
 
 
 
 
 All human beings are born free and equal in dignity and rights.

Because of the absence of space, in computer typography, the line-break have to be inserted manually, otherwise a long sentence will not break into new lines. Some computer input methods have put zero-width space (ZWS) instead for word break, which would then break the long sentences into multiple lanes, but the drawback of that method is it will not render the writing correctly.
  ("incorrect" words include the first two words, which in joined form would looks like )

Arabic script 
Before typewriter, computer and smartphones changed the way of writing, Arabic was written continuously. That is easy because 22 letters have a final form, which is comparable to initial, or capital, form for the Latin alphabet since the Renaissance. Six letters only have only one form, and whenever they occur in a word, there is some space in it that was originally as wide as the space between words. There was also no hyphenation either. In all early manuscripts, words were finished on the next line or, in many Quranic manuscripts, even on the next page.

Punjabi (Gurmukhi) script 
Before the 1970's, Gurbani and other Sikh scriptures were written in the traditional method of writing the Gurmukhi script known as larivār where there were no spacing between words in the texts (interpuncts in the form of a dot were used by some to differentiate between words, such as by Guru Arjan). This is opposed to the comparatively more recent method of writing in Gurmukhi known as pad ched, which breaks the words by inserting spacing between them.

See also 
 Interpunct, for the word dividers used before the advent of spacing
 Boustrophedon
 Codex Sinaiticus
 CamelCase

References

Writing systems without word boundaries
Writing systems